Mesopsocus immunis is a species of Psocoptera from the Mesopsocidae family that can be found throughout Western Europe (except for Denmark and Iceland), and Hungary.

References

Mesopsocidae
Insects described in 1836
Psocoptera of Europe